Fatepura is one of the 182 Legislative Assembly constituencies of Gujarat state in India. It is part of Dahod district, is reserved for candidates belonging to the Scheduled Tribes, and came into existence after 2008 delimitation.

List of segments
This assembly seat represents the following segments,

 Fatepura Taluka Villages -  Abhtalai, Dungara, jalai, Modhva, Dungra pani, Jatnana muvada,Fategadhi, Javesi, Margala, Jhab(east), Bariya ni hathod, Fatepura alias valunda, Kaliya lakhanpur, Mormahudi, Barsaleda, Gadra, Kankasiya, Bava ni hathod, Gava dungara, Lanthagar, mota natva, bhat muvadi, karmel, bhichor, moti charoli, nani charolivav, karodiya(fatepura), khakhariya, ghughas, bhitodi, kumana muvada, hadmat, hafwa, bhojela, chhalor, chikhli, dhadhela, inta, hindolia, kundla, kupda, lakhanpur, jaghadiya, li. adiya, dungar, zer, vandariya(east), rupakheda, jhagola, sagdapada, salara, kankasiya, vangad, vasiya kui, vakaner, vatli, vavdi(east), vaghvadla, vadvas, tadhigoli, Sukhsar ( silentknight SK residential )(dharmik panchal residential), sarsva(east), padaliya, nava gam, nidka(east), nava talav, nani rel(east), nani nadukan, nani dhadheli, dungar, makwana na varuna, khatarpur na muvada, bhat muvadi, gavadungara. 
 Jhalod Taluka (Part) Villages – Kadval, Hirola, Kunda, Dhalsimal,Dhamena, Jaror, Bodiya Bhint, Dhavdi Faliya, Chakisana, Vansiya, Dungra, Anika, Lavara, Trakda Mahudina Muvada,Sarori, Trakda Mahudi, Jitpur, Valunda, Kanji Khedi, Vaniya Ghanti, Kakreli, Bhaman, Moli, Itadi, Govinda Talai, Thala(Sanjeli), Kota, Kadvana Pad, Doka Talavdi, Jasuni, Galana Pad, Nenki, Zusa, Dhediyano Nalo, Dhediya, Sanjeli, Patela, Doki,Tisana Muvada, Chamariya, Nariyani Muvadi, Lunjana Muvada,Chandana Muvada, Kavdana Muvada, Kalyanpura, Pichhoda,Bachkariya, Mandli, Pratappura, Gasali, Nana Kaliya, Mota Kaliya,Bhamela, Bhanpur, Garadiya, Boda Dungar, Karamba.

Member of Legislative Assembly

Election results

2022

2017

2012

See also
 List of constituencies of the Gujarat Legislative Assembly
 Dahod district

References

External links
 

Assembly constituencies of Gujarat
Dahod district